Bernardus Petrus Leene (14 February 1903 – 24 November 1988) was a track cyclist from the Netherlands, who represented his native country at three Summer Olympics (1928, 1932 and 1936).

After having won a Gold at the 1928 Summer Olympics in Amsterdam, Netherlands (2.000 m Tandem), he captured the silver medal eight years later in the 2000 m Tandem.

He had one daughter, Antoinette, and two granddaughters, Marita and Monique. All three women were top swimmers and Monique was an Olympian, swimming for New Zealand in the 1976 Olympic games.

During World War II he was a prominent member of the Resistance in The Hague.

See also
 List of Dutch Olympic cyclists

References

External links

1903 births
1988 deaths
Cyclists from The Hague
Dutch male cyclists
Olympic cyclists of the Netherlands
Cyclists at the 1928 Summer Olympics
Cyclists at the 1932 Summer Olympics
Cyclists at the 1936 Summer Olympics
Olympic gold medalists for the Netherlands
Olympic silver medalists for the Netherlands
Olympic medalists in cycling
Medalists at the 1928 Summer Olympics
Medalists at the 1936 Summer Olympics
Dutch resistance members
Dutch track cyclists
20th-century Dutch people